"Mad Love" is a song recorded by Jamaican rapper Sean Paul and French music producer David Guetta, featuring guest vocals from American singer Becky G. It was written by  Shakira, Paul, Guetta, Majasty Jones, Emily Warren, Rosina Russell, Ina Wroldsen, Raoul Lionel Chen, Jack Patterson and Giorgio Tuinfort, with production handled by Guetta, Patterson, Tuinfort, Jason Jigzagula Henriques, Banx & Ranx and 1st Klase. The song was released via Island Records on 16 February 2018, as the fourth single from Paul's EP Mad Love the Prequel.

Background
The song was first revealed in June 2017 Islands label singer/songwriter Majasty Jones. It initially featured Colombian singer Shakira instead of Becky G. Speaking about the song, Sean Paul explained: "I got something kind of more poppy coming in a little while, with Shakira. The song's called 'Mad Love', it's about being mad and having love, it's more sexy. It's not about love, it's the sexiness." Paul later revealed in an interview with Billboard in August 2017 that the song was intended to be titled "Temple".

Paul said of the song in a press release: "I've been working on this record for a long time. It was a pleasure to work with David Guetta and his team as we got the production to the perfect sound. It was also great to work with Becky G and her team. Nuff love to all of them! The song is full of energy and I can't wait for people to hear it!" Guetta added that they spent two years working on the song, and he is grateful that the song is finally getting released. He is proud of the track, praising Paul for his "unique style" and Becky G for her vocals, which "just make everything come together". Becky G declared that she appreciates the opportunity to work with "an icon like Sean". She regarded "Mad Love" as a song that "brings people together" and "give you the energy you need to get up and get on the dance floor".

Critical reception
Xavier Hamilton of Vibe wrote that the song manages to "embody every aspect of a modern pop record" and "add to all of the artists' cross-cultural popularity". Rap-Up called it an "island-flavored collaboration" and a "dance floor-ready track". Chantilly Post of HotNewHipHop deemed it "a pop, radio-friendly track", writing "David provides a bouncy EDM beat that hears Becky and Sean sing about vibing and hitting it off to the 'tempo' of a song."

Credits and personnel
Credits adapted from Tidal.

 Sean Paul – composition, vocals
 David Guetta – composition, production
 Shakira – composition, production
 Becky G – vocals
 Emily Warren – composition
 Jack Patterson – composition, production
 Rosina Russell – composition
 Giorgio Tuinfort – composition, production
 Ina Wroldsen – composition
 Raoul Lionel Chen – composition
 Jason Jigzagula Henriques – production
 Banx & Ranx – production
 1st Klase – production
 Chris Athens – master engineering
 Zacharie Raymond – bass guitar, background vocals, drums, programming, synthesizer
 Yannick Rastogi – bass guitar, background vocals, drums, programming, synthesizer
 Serban Ghenea – mixing

Charts

Weekly charts

Year-end charts

Certifications

Release history

References

2018 singles
2018 songs
Sean Paul songs
David Guetta songs
Becky G songs
Island Records singles
Songs written by Sean Paul
Songs written by David Guetta
Songs written by Emily Warren
Songs written by Shakira
Songs written by Jack Patterson (Clean Bandit)
Songs written by Giorgio Tuinfort
Songs written by Ina Wroldsen
Song recordings produced by David Guetta
Songs written by Diztortion